Odd-Arne Jacobsen (born 29 December 1947) is a Norwegian guitarist and songwriter. He stands today as a unique personal "voice" in European improvisation music, with his own distinctive tone language. Odd-Arne has worked with most of the leading artists in Norway in theatre and music, and has also presented his art internationally. He has had his own television programme in Russia, as well as a solo concert at the Moscow International Jazz Festival and has toured the United States, Mexico, Russia, France, China, Kuwait, Scotland, and Japan. In 1990 he undertook a solo concert of his own compositions in Carnegie Hall, New York.

Musical career
In the early 1970s Jacobsen toured with the saxophonist Jan Garbarek, bassist Arild Andersen and the finish percussionist Edward Vesala. Odd-Arne soon discovered he didn't want to be an ECM artist and decided to go his own ways. Projects and tours in Japan and China soon led him to expressions his music would be influenced by. Odd-Arne Jacobsen is the first Norwegian guitar player ever to hold a solo concert in Weil Recital Hall at Carnegie Hall, New York. He has also done his own TV shows both in Norwegian television (NRK) and in Russian TV with the show "Vinter nattens hemmeligheter". His success in Russia has also included a performance at Moscow international jazzfestival as a guest solo artist with the Russian guitarists Alexei Kuznetsovs quartet. Jacobsen is also one of the few Norwegians who have toured with alto saxophonist Arne Domnerus and the Swedish jazz guitarist Rune Gustafsson. He also played a Robert Normann memorial gig with Rune Gustafsson in Sarpsborg, Norway.

Odd-Arne has also had great success as a composer. In the recent years he has written "Music for the silence minority" for guitar, string quartet and bassoon. It was performed for the first time at an art-exhibition with works from Edvard Munch and Gustav Vigeland at the Munch Museum in Oslo.
He also played the opening concert at Nordlysfestivalen in Tromsø, Norway in January 2007. Together with the MIN Ensamble and Edvard Debess he performed his work "For strings Only" written for string quintet and guitar for the first time. Odd-Arne are currently working with music students from the University in Tromsø – the world northernmost university. Odd-Arne is also supervisor for music students at Telemark University College.

Odd-Arne is currently working with the composition `` Sempre Dowland "(always Dowland) on the occasion of the lutenist/composer John Downland’s 450 years anniversary in 2013 .
The instrumentation will be a String Quintet (two violins, a viola, a cello and an upright bass) and a song octet (2 sopr, 2alto, 2 ten and 2 bass). The project has been possible thanks to the support of the Norwegian Composers Compensation Fund.

Odd-Arne Jacobsen has now started a project with the world famous guitarist Jan Akkerman from the legendary progrock band Focus. They play their first gig in Amsterdam 8 September 2016 and will also perform at Bodø Jazz Open in February 2017.

Discography

Albums

External links
 Official Website

1947 births
Living people
Norwegian musicians